Al-Rahinah or The Hostage is a 1984 Yemeni short novel by Zayd Mutee' Dammaj. It was selected by the Arab Writers Union as one of the 100 best Arabic novels of the 20th century. The novel has been translated into French, English (by May Jayyusi and Christopher Tingley), German, Russian and Hindi.

References

Novels by Zayd Mutee' Dammaj
Arabic-language novels
1984 novels